The 1986 Virginia Slims of California was a women's  tennis tournament played on indoor carpet courts in Oakland, California in the United States. It was part of the 1985 Virginia Slims World Championship Series and was played from February 24 through March 2, 1986. Second-seeded Chris Evert-Lloyd won the singles title.

Finals

Singles
 Chris Evert-Lloyd defeated  Kathy Jordan 6–2, 6–4
 It was Evert-Lloyd's 3rd singles title of the year and the 145th of her career.

Doubles
 Hana Mandlíková /  Wendy Turnbull defeated  Bonnie Gadusek /  Helena Suková 7–6(7–5), 6–1

Notes

References

External links
 ITF tournament edition details
 Tournament draws

Virginia Slims Of California, 1986
Silicon Valley Classic
Virginia Slims of California
Virginia Slims of California
Virginia Slims of California
Virginia Slims of California